L-type or type-l or variation, may refer to:

L-type
 L-type asteroid
 L-type star
 L-type lectin domain
 L-type calcium channel
 L-type ligand
 Japanese L type submarine
 L type carriage, rail car
 MG L-type, an automobile
 Renault L-Type engine

Type-L
 Type L socket, AC power
 Zeppelin-Staaken Type "L", airplane
 Morane Saulnier Type L, airplane
 R.E.P. Type L Parasol, airplane
 Handley Page Type L, airplane
 Blackburn Type L, airplane
 Caudron Type L, airplane
 Thulin Type L, airplane
 Japanese Type L submarine
 Soviet Type L submarine
 Type L grenade

See also

 
 
 
 
 Type 1 (disambiguation)
 Type (disambiguation)
 L (disambiguation)
 L class (disambiguation) or Class-L